"I Wanna Know" is a song by American R&B singer Joe. It was written by Joe, Joylon Skinner and Michele Williams for his third studio album My Name Is Joe (2000), while production was helmed by Joe and Tony Nicholas, featuring additional credit from Timmy Allen. It also appeared on the soundtrack to the film The Wood (1999). Released as a single, it reached number four on the US Billboard Hot 100 and number two on the Hot R&B/Hip-Hop Songs chart. The song was ranked fourth on the Billboard Hot 100's 2000 year-end chart.

Background
According to the song's co-producer Edwin "Tony" Nicholas, "I Wanna Know" was originally intended for Joe's previous album All That I Am. He removed the song from the final track listing due to taking issue with the label heads wanting to be involved in the creative process. A few years later, he was asked to contribute a song to a soundtrack and claimed he didn't have anything to send to the record label. He then sent in "I Wanna Know" because it happened to be lying around the studio.

A special remix of the song, entitled "The Roni Remix", can be found on a special U.K. edition of the album as a bonus track. The remix retains most of the original version's lyrics but features a different instrumental from its original as well as additional lyrics.
Another Remix entitled "Phat Butt Remix" by Beau "Dj Bo" van Gils is made in the "2Bro'z" Boomroll Studio's in roermond The Netherlands, additional raps are also done by DJ BO. This remix is released on vinyl 12 inch and as bonustrack on the album.

Music video
The music video (directed by Bille Woodruff) starts out with a woman (played by Claudia Jordan) having an argument with her boyfriend in an alley off the street. Joe and two of his friends see the ongoing argument and after the woman's boyfriend leaves he approaches her and talks to her, in the process of obtaining her phone number. The rest of the music video shows Joe and the woman spending time with each other as their relationship becomes stronger. The woman is assumed to have cut off her relationship with her boyfriend from the beginning of the music video.

Track listings

Charts

Weekly charts

Year-end charts

Decade-end charts

Release history

References

1990s ballads
1999 songs
2000 singles
Contemporary R&B ballads
Jive Records singles
Joe (singer) songs
Song recordings produced by Joe (singer)
Songs written by Joe (singer)
Songs written by Michele Williams